John Patrick Boyle Sr. (February 9, 1880 – March 3, 1968) was an American lawyer and politician.

Boyle was born in Glencoe, McLeod County, Minnesota. He went to parochial and public schools in St. Cloud, Minnesota and Melrose, Minnesota. Boyle went to Valparaiso University and then received his law degree from Indiana University Maurer School of Law. He lived in Eveleth, St. Louis County, Minnesota with his wife and family and practiced law. Boyle served as the Eveleth City Attorney and as the St. Louis County Assistant District Attorney. He also served in the Minnesota Senate from 1911 to 1914 and was a Republican. He moved to Douglas, Arizona in 1915 and then moved to Tucson, Arizona. Boyle died in Tucson, Arizona.

References

1880 births
1968 deaths
People from Eveleth, Minnesota
People from McLeod County, Minnesota
Valparaiso University alumni
Indiana University Maurer School of Law alumni
Minnesota lawyers
Republican Party Minnesota state senators